Jacob Åke Stefan Ortmark (born 29 August 1997) is a Swedish professional footballer who plays as a midfielder for IFK Norrköping.

Career

IF Brommapojkarna
On 9 January 2019 IF Brommapojkarna announced, that Ortmark had left the club.

Degerfors IF
After breaking with IF Brommapojkarna, Ortmark joined Degerfors IF on 19 February 2019.

IK Sirius
Before the 2021 Allsvenskan season, Ortmark was signed by IK Sirius on a three-year contract.

IFK Norrköping
After only a year in Uppsala, Ortmark signed a four-year contract with IFK Norrköping as a replacement for Alexander Fransson.

References

External links
 
 

1997 births
Living people
Association football midfielders
IF Brommapojkarna players
Gefle IF players
Degerfors IF players
IK Sirius Fotboll players
IFK Norrköping players
Swedish footballers
Allsvenskan players
Superettan players
Ettan Fotboll players
Sweden youth international footballers